Keep the Fire is the third studio album by American singer-songwriter Kenny Loggins, released in 1979. It is perhaps best known for the hit single "This is It". The song was co-written by Michael McDonald, who also performed on the track. Michael Jackson sings backup vocals on the track "Who's Right, Who's Wrong".

Track listing

Personnel 
 Kenny Loggins – lead and backing vocals, guitars, vocoder (7)
 Brian Mann – keyboards, horn arrangements (1, 3–6, 8, 9), accordion solo (5) 
 Michael McDonald – acoustic piano (3), harmony vocals (3)
 Max Gronenthal – ARP synthesizer programming
 Mike Hamilton – guitars, backing vocals, harmony vocals (3, 8)
 Fred Tackett – acoustic guitar (8, 9)
 George Hawkins – bass guitar, backing vocals, harmony vocals (2, 3, 8)
 Tris Imboden – drums, percussion
 Milt Holland – percussion
 Paulinho da Costa – percussion (3)
 Jon Clarke – tambourine, English horn, flute, oboe, recorder, saxophone, horn arrangements (2, 7)
 Vince Denham – cabasa, saxophone, flute
 Michael Brecker – tenor sax solo (6)
 Richard Stekol – harmony vocals (2)
 Michael Jackson – harmony vocals (6)
 Richard Page – harmony vocals (6)
 Jeff Bouchard – harmony vocals (8)

Production 
 Producer – Tom Dowd
 Engineer – Steve Gersky
 Second Engineer – Michael Carnavale
 Recorded at Filmways/Wally Heider Recording, Hollywood, CA, and Santa Barbara Sound Recording (Santa Barbara, CA).
 Mastering – Mike Fuller at Criteria Studios (Miami, FL).
 Guitar Synthesizer Technician – Wayne Williams
 Visual Coordinator – Tony Lane
 Design Concept – Kenny Loggins and Scott Thom
 Cover Painting – Scott Thom
 Cover Photography – Ed Caraeff
 Sleeve Photography – Eva Ein Loggins
 Crew – Mitch Miller, Johnny Pace and C. Wolfstock Wittenberg.
 Management – Larson & Recor Associates

Reception
Rolling Stone magazine described it as "the new sound of Southern California: a sophisticated, diffuse, jazz-inflected pop rock performed by an augmented rock band in which guitar and keyboards share equal prominence" and "churning romantic atmosphere constructed around a matinee idol's voice".

Legacy
The award-winning short film, "Keep the Fire" by Jake Rice serves as a fictionalized "Behind the Album Cover" story, detailing the origin of the glowing white orb in Kenny's hands on the cover and the people who were involved in the creation of his hit record.  The film includes computer graphics enhanced dramatizations depicting Michael McDonald, Tom Dowd, George Daly, Scott Thom, and Eva Ein.  It features musical performances of "This Is It" and the acoustic version of "What A Fool Believes" as performed by Loggins and McDonald on the live recording "Outside: Live From The Redwoods".

Charts

Weekly charts

Year-end charts

References

1979 albums
Kenny Loggins albums
Albums produced by Tom Dowd
Columbia Records albums
Albums recorded at Wally Heider Studios